The 1984 United States presidential election in the District of Columbia was held on November 6, 1984 as part of the 1984 United States presidential election. Democratic candidate Walter Mondale won D.C. with 85% of the vote, giving him three electoral votes. In the general election, he only carried a total of 13 electoral votes, the other 10 coming from his home state of Minnesota. The incumbent Ronald Reagan won re-election in 1984, carrying 49 U.S. states.

Mondale's victory in the District of Columbia was the largest out of any location, and was one of only two electoral jurisdictions to vote Democratic.

In the midst of a Reagan landslide nationwide, the District weighed in 89.9% more Democratic than the national average, the furthest from the national average it has ever voted.

See also
 United States presidential elections in the District of Columbia
 1984 United States presidential election in Minnesota, the only other area to vote Democratic in the 1984 United States presidential election.

References

Washington, D.C.
1984
United States Pres